Ludagun (simplified Chinese: 驴打滚; traditional Chinese: 驢打滾; pinyin: lǘ dǎ gǔn), also called as "doumiangao" or "fried chop rice cake", is a traditional Manchu snack in China. It has origins from Manchuria, and later became famous in Beijing. The yellow soybean flour sprinkled over the pastry makes it look like a donkey rolling on the loess, which gives its Chinese name "Lu Da Gun" (rolling donkey).

Origins 
The origin of the ludagun comes from a folk tale. The story said that in Qing Dynasty, Empress Dowager Cixi was tired of imperial food, so she asked the royal chef to cook something new. After delibrate thought, the chef decided to make a dish using sticky rice and bean paste. When the chef finished cooking, a young eunuch, named Lu (pronounced as "lyu", the same pronunciation as donkey in Chinese), carelessly dropped the dish into soya bean flour, but there was no time to re-make the dish. The chef had to serve it to Cixi. However, Cixi praised the taste and wondered what was the name of that dish. The chef never thought about this question, but he named it as "Lu Da Gun" (rolling donkey) to credit eunuch Lu's carelessness.

Ingredients

Modern Lüdagun 
The main ingredients are sticky rice flour, red bean paste, and soybean flour. The exact recipe for making a ludagun may vary depended on regions and eras, but the general steps for making a modern Lüdagun are described as follows. The sticky rice flour is first mixed with warm water to a dough, then after being steamed, the sticky rice paste is shaped into a long strip covered with red bean paste on top, and then it is rolled up into a cylinder-shaped pastry. Finally the pastry is sprinkled with soybean flour, and it is ready to be served.

Traditional Lüdagun 
Compared to a modern Lüdagun, the filling in a traditional Lüdagun is brown sugar syrup rather than red bean paste. The recipe of making a traditional Lüdagun and the scenario of selling a Lüdagun is documented by Zhang Jiangcai (simplified Chinese: 张江裁) in "Popular Food and Goods in Yenching" (simplified Chinese:《燕京民间食货史料》) :

A similar recipe is also documented in a poem called "Lüdagun" in "The Custom of Peking" (simplified Chinese:《北平民俗类征》):

References 

Chinese culture
Brand name snack foods